The 1908 Giro di Lombardia was the fourth edition of the Giro di Lombardia cycle race and was held on 8 November 1908. The race started in Milan and finished in Sesto San Giovanni. The race was won by François Faber of the Peugeot team.

General classification

References

1908
Giro di Lombardia
Giro di Lombardia